Gabiria is a town and municipality located in the region of Goierri of the province of Gipuzkoa, in the autonomous community of the Basque Country, northern Spain.

References

External links
 Gabiria municipal government official website 
 GABIRIA in the Bernardo Estornés Lasa - Auñamendi Encyclopedia (Euskomedia Fundazioa) 

Municipalities in Gipuzkoa